Charles Joseph Marie Ruijs de Beerenbrouck (1 December 1873 – 17 April 1936) was a Dutch politician of the defunct Roman Catholic State Party (RKSP), later formed to the Catholic People's Party (KVP) now merged into the Christian Democratic Appeal (CDA). He served as Prime Minister of the Netherlands from 9 September 1918 until 4 August 1925 and from 10 August 1929 until 26 May 1933.

Early life
Charles Joseph Maria Ruijs de Beerenbrouck was born on 1 December 1873 in Roermond, a town with a Bishop's see in the province of Limburg, in the very south of the Netherlands. Born into an aristocratic family, he grew up in a predominantly-Catholic community and went to school in Maastricht and in The Hague. He attended the Utrecht University and in 1895, he obtained his master's degree in law at the Leiden University.

He was the son of Gustave Ruijs de Beerenbrouck (1842–1926), Minister of Justice in the Mackay cabinet (founder of the labour and social laws first) and later governor of Limburg (1918).

Career
He started his career in 1896 as a lawyer in Maastricht. In 1899 Ruijs de Beerenbrouck became a member of the Maastricht municipal council and in 1905 he was elected to the House of Representatives. Ruijs de Beerenbrouck remained a councillor and a member of parliament until 16 May 1918, when he became Queen's Commissioner of the province of Limburg (in the province of Limburg usually called Gouverneur, or Governor).

Ruijs de Beerenbrouck did not stay in office as Queen's Commissioner for long, as on 9 September 1918 he was appointed as Prime Minister of the Netherlands.

As Prime Minister he had to deal with the aftermath of World War I. Although the Netherlands had remained neutral during the conflict, Ruijs de Beerenbrouck nevertheless faced several problems, particularly the return of German troops through the province of Limburg and the exile of the German emperor Wilhelm II.

In November 1918 the leader of the Social Democratic Workers' Party (SDAP), Pieter Jelles Troelstra, inspired by the Russian Revolution and the German Revolution of 1918–19, called for a socialist revolution among the working class. However, the revolution attempt of Troelstra met with little enthusiasm. Despite this, Ruijs de Beerenbrouck enacted several social reforms in order to satisfy the working class.

From 1925 to 1929 Ruijs de Beerenbrouck was Speaker of the House of Representatives.

During his third cabinet Ruijs de Beerenbrouck had to deal with the worldwide Great Depression of 1929 and the early 1930s, which had crippling effects on the Dutch economy, effects which lasted longer than they did in most European countries. The depression lead to large unemployment and poverty, as well as increasing social unrest. Ruijs de Beerenbrouck was forced to cut down government expenses and to devaluate the national currency, the Guilder, but these measures only worsened the effects of the economic crisis.

In February 1933 the third cabinet Ruijs de Beerenbrouck ordered the bombing of the navy cruiser De Zeven Provinciën, when sailors aboard the cruiser, cruising near Sumatra, mutinied because of the cutting of their wages. Twenty three mutineers were killed, resulting in a prolonged controversy and recriminations.

In 1933 Ruijs de Beerenbrouck again became Speaker of the House of Representatives. He remained in office until his death.

Personal life
On 15 April 1902, Ruijs de Beerenbrouck married Maria van der Heyden (19 August 1877 – 17 January 1948). Ruijs de Beerenbrouck died on 17 April 1936 at the age of 62 in Utrecht.

Decorations

References

External links
 Moeyes, Paul: Beerenbrouck, Charkes Ruijs de, in: 1914-1918-online. International Encyclopedia of the First World War.

 

 
 

1873 births
1936 deaths
Deaths from Addison's disease
Dutch jurists
Dutch Roman Catholics
Dutch prosecutors
Dutch political party founders
Grand Crosses of the Order of the Crown (Belgium)
Jonkheers of the Netherlands
Knights Grand Cross of the Order of Orange-Nassau
Knights of the Holy Sepulchre
King's and Queen's Commissioners of Limburg
Leiden University alumni
Ministers of Agriculture of the Netherlands
Ministers of Colonial Affairs of the Netherlands
Ministers of Economic Affairs of the Netherlands
Ministers of Foreign Affairs of the Netherlands
Ministers of the Interior of the Netherlands
Ministers of State (Netherlands)
Members of the House of Representatives (Netherlands)
Municipal councillors of Maastricht
Neurological disease deaths in the Netherlands
Utrecht University alumni
Speakers of the House of Representatives (Netherlands)
Recipients of the Order of the Netherlands Lion
Recipients of the Order of the House of Orange
Roman Catholic State Party politicians
Prime Ministers of the Netherlands
People from Roermond
Politicians from Utrecht (city)
20th-century Dutch civil servants
20th-century Dutch lawyers
20th-century Dutch politicians